"Breathe" is a song by British synthpop duo Erasure. It was released by Mute Records in the UK and the US as the first single from the band's 11th studio album, Nightbird (2005). Written and produced by Erasure members Vince Clarke and Andy Bell, the song was remixed slightly for its radio version. The UK CD single includes CD-ROM information that allowed buyers to download the Digipro software package and use isolated musical tracks of "Breathe" to create their own remixes. For a short time, fans were able to upload their finished "Breathe" remixes to Erasure's website to share with others.

"Breathe" is widely regarded as a major return to form by critics and fans alike, who compared the tracks to Erasure's work from the late 1980s and early 1990s. "Breathe" also resonated with the record-buying public and reached number four on the UK Singles Chart, becoming their 17th and last top 10 hit. In the United States, "Breathe" became Erasure's second chart-topper on the Billboard Dance Club Songs chart. In Denmark, the song reached number one, while in Germany, it was Erasure's 20th top-40 single, peaking at number 35.

Track listings

UK CD1 (CDMute330)
 "Breathe"
 "Gone Crazy"

UK CD2 (LCDMute330)
 "Breathe" (LMC extended club mix)
 "Breathe" (When Andy Bell Met Manhattan Clique extended remix)
 "Breathe" (acoustic version)
 Enhanced section

UK DVD single (DVDMute330)
 "Breathe" (video)
 "Breathe" (radio version audio)
 "Mr. Gribber and His Amazing Cat" (audio)

UK and US digital download
 "Breathe" (radio version) – 3:54

US enhanced CD single (9259-2)
 "Breathe" (radio version)
 "Breathe" (album version)
 "Gone Crazy"
 "Mr. Gribber and His Amazing Cat"
 "Breathe" (acoustic version)
 "Breathe" (Pete Heller's Phela mix)
 "Breathe" (LMC extended club mix)
 "Breathe" (When Andy Bell Met Manhattan Clique extended remix)
 "Breathe" (enhanced CD-ROM video)

Charts

Release history

See also
 List of Billboard Hot Dance Club Play number ones of 2005

References

2005 singles
2005 songs
Erasure songs
Mute Records singles
Number-one singles in Denmark
Songs written by Andy Bell (singer)
Songs written by Vince Clarke